Acts of Love may refer to:

Acts of Love, a 1978 novel by Elia Kazan
Acts of Love (film), a 2021 docu-fiction film
Acts of Love, an alternate title for the 1996 film Carried Away
Acts of Love (album), a 1985 album of poems by Penny Rimbaud

See also
Act of Love (disambiguation)